Ballophilus differens is a species of centipede in the genus Ballophilus. It is found in Angola.

References 

Ballophilidae
Arthropods of Angola
Animals described in 1951